Mohammad Ali Sarkar is a Jatiya Party (Ershad) politician and the former Member of Parliament of Rangpur-2.

Career
Sarkar was elected to parliament from Rangpur-2 as a Jatiya Party candidate in 2001.

References

Jatiya Party politicians
Living people
8th Jatiya Sangsad members
Year of birth missing (living people)